The Kabarnet Museum is a museum located in Kabarnet, Kenya. It features galleries relating to the Great Rift Valley and its peoples, including the Keiyo / Marakwet, Samburu, Pokot, Nandi and Kipsigis.

See also 
 List of museums in Kenya

References 

Museums in Kenya
Great Rift Valley